Virginia elected its members in April 1825, after the term began but before the new Congress convened.

See also 
 1824 Virginia's 13th congressional district special election
 1824 and 1825 United States House of Representatives elections
 List of United States representatives from Virginia

Notes 

1825
Virginia
United States House of Representatives